José María Caffarel Fábregas (10 November 1919 – 6 November 1999) was a Spanish film actor. He appeared in more than 170 films between 1957 and 1998. He was born in Barcelona and died in Madrid, Spain.

Selected filmography

 The Last Torch Song (1957) - Monsieur Dupois - Empresario de París
 La cárcel de cristal (1957) - Médico
 Fulano y Mengano (1957) - Señor que da limosnas (uncredited)
 Historias de la feria (1958) - Sr. Bosch
 Distrito quinto (1958) - Cómplice - falso policía
 Giovane canaglia (1958)
 Ana dice sí (1958) - M. Holloway
 La muralla (1958) - Banquero
 El frente infinito (1959) - Médico
 Buen viaje, Pablo (1959) - Fuentes
 Muerte al amanecer (1959) - Costa
 Crimen para recién casados (1960) - Comisario
 The Crossroads (1960) - Martínez
 The Big Show (1960) - Valera
 Llama un tal Esteban (1960) - Inspector
 Tu marido nos engaña (1960)
 Gaudí (1960) - Vizconde Güell
 El emigrante (1960) - Governador
 El indulto (1960) - Defensor
 Los abanderados de la Providencia (1960)
 Anchor Button (1961) - Segundo Comandante
 Green Harvest (1961)
 Hay alguien detrás de la puerta (1961) - Dr. Vegas
 Conqueror of Maracaibo (1961) - Pirat
 Las estrellas (1961) - Sr. Rebollo
 Los cuervos (1961) - Miembro del consejo
 Plácido (1961) - Zapater
 El amor empieza en sábado (1961) - Doctor
 Tres de la Cruz Roja (1961) - (uncredited)
 Los pedigüeños (1961) - Hombre de la carretera
 Mi adorable esclava (1962) - Director del banco
 Teresa de Jesús (1962) - Obispo de Ávila 
 Tómbola (1962) - Don Matías, el comisario
 Han matado a un cadáver (1962) - Señor Evans
 The Son of Captain Blood (1962) - Gov. Dawson
 Der Teppich des Grauens (1962) - Vane
 Detective con faldas (1962) - Comisario Dupuy
 Accidente 703 (1962) - Hipólito
 The Gang of Eight (1962)
 The Lovely Lola (1962) - Empresario
 Vuelve San Valentín (1962) - Don Lucio
 Atraco a las tres (1962) - Director General
 Ipnosi (1962) - Psychiatrist
 La gran familia (1962) - Vecino de la TV
 Rogelia (1962) - Director del penal
 Operación Embajada (1963) - Rómulo Galindo
 The Castilian (1963) - Moro principal
 Rocío from La Mancha (1963) - Don Zacarías
 La casta Susana (1963) - Alcade (uncredited)
 The Blackmailers (1963)
 Carta a una mujer (1963) - Rafael
 Ensayo general para la muerte (1963) - Director
 Marisol rumbo a Río (1963) - Empleado de Banca
 Piedra de toque (1963) - Lino Salazar
 The Secret of the Black Widow (1963) - Cartwright
 Pacto de silencio (1963) - Matías Lecumberri
 Benigno, hermano mío (1963)
 Crucero de verano (1964) - Dueño del tablao Andalucía
 Circus World (1964) - Barcelona's Mayor
 Backfire (1964) - (uncredited)
 Alféreces provisionales (1964) - Comandante (uncredited)
 Stop at Tenerife (1964) - Comisario
 El salario del crimen (1964) - Director del Banco
 El señor de La Salle (1964) - Rogier
 Dulcinea del Toboso (1964)
 El puente de la ilusión (1965)
 Flor salvaje (1965)
 La extranjera (1965)
 Television Stories (1965) - Directivo de Relojes Radiant (1)
 Más bonita que ninguna (1965) - Señor en fiesta
 Savage Pampas (1965) - Vigo
 El mundo sigue (1965) - Julito
 Marie-Chantal contre le docteur Kha (1965)
 Wild Kurdistan (1965)
 Our Agent Tiger (1965) - Col. Pontarlier
 Train d'enfer (1965) - Technicien de la police
 Doctor Zhivago (1965) - Militiaman (uncredited)
 Suena el clarín (1965)
 Rose rosse per Angelica (1966) - Louis XVI
 Monnaie de singe (1966)
 Lightning Bolt (1966) - Archie White / Rehte's Manager
 Lost Command (1966) - Minor Role (uncredited)
 Algunas lecciones de amor (1966) - Padre de Juan
 Acompáñame (1966) - Profesor
 Dynamite Jim (1966)
 Our Man in Casablanca (1966) - Ali Ahmed
 The Sea Pirate (1966) - Blaise, le père de Marie-Catherine
 The Lost Woman (1966) - Deputado #1
 Il grande colpo di Surcouf (1966) - Blaise, le père de Marie-Catherine
 El aventurero de Guaynas (1966)
 Espi... ando (1966)
 Mexican Slayride (1967) - Langis
 Las 4 bodas de Marisol (1967) - Dueño del restaurante
 El rostro del asesino (1967) - Romano
 Un hombre vino a matar (1967) - Martin Anderson
 Lo que cuesta vivir... (1967) - Sr. Társilo
 Pero... ¿en qué país vivimos? (1967) - Sr. Gonzálvez
 Bang Bang Kid (1967) - Mayor Skaggel
 El hueso (1967) - Don Enrique
 Yo no soy un asesino (1988)
 Ragan (1968) - 'Uncle' Borrell
 Madigan's Millions (1968)
 Eve (1968) - José
 Cristina Guzmán (1968) - Dr. Montero
 Prisionero en la ciudad (1969) - Comisario Hernández
 Tristana (1970) - Don Zenón
 En un lugar de La Manga (1970) - Presidente
 Una señora llamada Andrés (1970) - Médico
 The Tigers of Mompracem (1970) - Maharaja Varauni
 Nights and Loves of Don Juan (1971) - (uncredited)
 Un aller simple (1971) - (uncredited)
 Si estás muerto, ¿por qué bailas? (1971) - Policía (voice, uncredited)
 Boulevard du Rhum (1971) - Le notaire
 Kill! Kill! Kill! Kill! (1971) - Algate
 The Legend of Frenchie King (1971) - (uncredited)
 Alta tensión (1972)
 Cerco de terror (1972)
 Le complot (1973) - (uncredited)
 Ricco the Mean Machine (1973) - The Marsigliese
 Las señoritas de mala compañía (1973) - Jaime Roig Vidal
 Separación matrimonial (1973) - Don Anselmo
 Proceso a Jesús (1974) - Interprete de Poncio Pilatos
 ¿... Y el prójimo? (1974)
 Touch Me Not (1974) - Hugh
 La femme aux bottes rouges (1974) - (uncredited)
 The Passenger (1975) - Hotel Keeper (uncredited)
 Una abuelita de antes de la guerra (1975) - Profesor
 Breakout (1975) - Prison Doctor (uncredited)
 Order to Kill (1975) - Richard
 Leonor (1975) - Doctor
 Bride to Be (1975) - Deán
 Tío, ¿de verdad vienen de París? (1977) - Comisario de policía
 Viaje al centro de la Tierra (1977) - Professor Fridleson
 Uno del millón de muertos (1977)
 Tengamos la guerra en paz (1977) - Carmelo
 Luto riguroso (1977) - Notario
 Stay as You Are (1978) - Bartolo
 Una familia decente (1978) - Presidente
 L'ingorgo (1979)
 Supersonic Man (1979) - Prof. Morgan / Gordon
 Polvos mágicos (1979) - Conde
 Mis relaciones con Ana (1979) - D. Alejandro
 Estigma (1980) - Taxista / taxi driver
 El lobo negro (1981)
 Gay Club (1981) - Herminio
 Puente aéreo (1981) - Momplet
 Duelo a muerte (1981) - Diego
 Jeremy (Concierto para dos) (1982)
 Memorias del general Escobar (1984) - Manuel Azaña
 Mon ami Washington (1984)
 Professor Poopsnagle's Steam Zeppelin (1985) - Doctor García
 Dragon Rapide (1986) - Comisario Policía
 El viaje a ninguna parte (1986) - Director de cine
 Jarrapellejos (1988) - Juez
 Al Andalus (1989)
 Pasión de hombre (1989) - Don Jesus
 Fine Gold (1989) - Don Sebastián
 Blood and Sand (1989) - Mayor
 There Was a Castle with Forty Dogs (1990) - Le notaire
 The Rogue Stallion (1990, TV Movie) - Gonzales
 Solo o en compañía de otros (1991) - Prosecutor
 Ho sap el ministre? (1991) - Josep Fils
 Dyningar (1991) - Editor Corrales
 El beso del sueño (1992) - El Cura
 Niño nadie (1997) - Don Faustino
 Licántropo (1997) - Dr. Jeremy Westenra
 Todas hieren (1998) - Finsterlin

External links

1919 births
1999 deaths
Spanish male film actors
20th-century Spanish male actors